Frank Garcia may refer to:

Frank Garcia (basketball) (c. 1918–1956), American professional basketball player
Frank Garcia (magician) (1927–1993)
Frank Garcia (offensive lineman) (born 1972), American football offensive lineman
Frank Garcia (paleontologist) 
Frank Garcia (punter) (born 1957), American football punter

See also
Francisco García (disambiguation)
Frank López García, Cuban association footballer